Eumorphocerus is a genus of beetles in the family Buprestidae, containing the following species:

 Eumorphocerus costipennis Descarpentries, 1968
 Eumorphocerus laticornis Thery, 1930
 Eumorphocerus peyrierasi Descarpentries, 1968
 Eumorphocerus vadoni Descarpentries, 1968

References

Buprestidae genera